Derevnya Khozyaystva Zagotskota (Zagotskot Xujalığı) is a rural locality (a village) in Buzdyaksky Selsoviet, Buzdyaksky District, Bashkortostan, Russia. The population was 116 as of 2010. There are 2 streets.

Geography 
The village is located 19 km northeast of Buzdyak (the district's administrative centre) by road. Staroamirovo is the nearest rural locality.

References 

Rural localities in Buzdyaksky District